{{DISPLAYTITLE:C6H4N4}}
The molecular formula C6H4N4 (molar mass: 132.12 g/mol, exact mass: 132.0436 u) may refer to:

 Pteridine
 Tricyanoaminopropene (TRIAP)